The Istrian Y is a highway complex in the Croatian highway network, consisting of section A8 Matulji-Kanfanar and section A9 Slovenian border-Kanfanar-Pula. It is called the Istrian Y because it is shaped like the letter Y, with the three stretches all meeting at Kanfanar interchange in south central Istria. The complex was built and will be maintained by the company BINA Istra until 2027.

Eastern branch 

The branch was initially built as a single carriageway limited-access road, but the part between Kanfanar and Pazin was projected as a dual carriageway, so all the objects on the road are already prepared for a conversion to a motorway.

The tunnel was opened in 1981 and is the main road that connects the Istrian peninsula with Rijeka and the rest of Croatia. The current toll for the tunnel is 28 HRK for passenger cars.

First part opened as motorway, from Kanfanar to Rogovići, was opened for traffic in 2011. Second, from Rogovići to Cerovlje, was opened for traffic in 2020, and third, from Cerovlje to Lupoglav, in 2021. Section from Lupoglav to Vranja, second tube of Učka tunnel and section from Učka tunnel to Matulji are yet to be converted to motorway. Section from Lupoglav to Vranja is to be completed in 2021, while second tube of Učka tunnel and section from Učka tunnel to Matulji are to be completed by 2024.

Western branch 

Motorway was initially built as single carriageway limited-access road.

There are two prominent object on this branch of Istrian Y: the viaduct "Limska draga" and the bridge "Mirna".  

The viaduct "Limska draga" was built between 1988 and 1991 and was the first part of the western branch of Istrian Y that was constructed. The bridge is 552 m long and the height of the highest pillon is 120 m.

The bridge "Mirna" was opened to traffic in 2005. The bridge represents the crossing over river Mirna and was the most complicated object on the western branch of the Istrian Y because of the swampy terrain around the river. The bridge is 1355 m long and the height of the bridge at the highest point is 40 m. Currently the bridge is being tolled at the price of 14 HRK for passenger cars.

The southern leg of A9 motorway, between Kanfanar and Pula was opened as motorway for traffic in 2010. The northern leg of the A9 motorway, 50 km from Umag to Kanfanar, was opened as motorway for traffic on 14 June 2011, eight months before the deadline.

See also 
 BINA Istra

References

External links 
 Viadukt company web-page about the viaduct
 The web page of Istria county, containing regulatory plans

Y
Motorways in Croatia